Hexadrin may refer to:
 Cyclophosphamide - a drug used to treat cancer and autoimmune disease
 Endrin - an organochloride insecticide